Hubert Clompe (22 July 1910 – 30 December 1995) was a Romanian ski jumper. He competed in the individual event at the 1936 Winter Olympics.

References

External links
 

1910 births
1995 deaths
Romanian male ski jumpers
Olympic ski jumpers of Romania
Ski jumpers at the 1936 Winter Olympics
Sportspeople from Brașov